Arne Holm may refer to:

Arne Holm (athlete) (born 1961), Swedish athlete
Arne O. Holm (born 1956), Norwegian journalist and newspaper editor
Arne E. Holm (1911–2009), Norwegian painter, graphic artist and architect